Hickson 44 (HCG 44) is a group of galaxies in the constellation Leo. As Arp 316, a part of this group is also designated as group of galaxies in the Atlas of Peculiar Galaxies.

Members

References

44
Leo (constellation)